Alexandra Hospital is an acute general hospital in Redditch, Worcestershire, England. It is managed by the Worcestershire Acute Hospitals NHS Trust.

History
The hospital, which replaced the Smallwood Hospital at Church Green, was completed in 1985. It was officially opened by Princess Alexandra in April 1987.

After four consultants left the hospital because of "continuing uncertainty about the future of Redditch Hospital" in February 2015, there were calls from a local pressure group for Government intervention. Then, in May 2015, a new modular operating theatre was opened at the hospital, thereby increasing capacity.

References

External links

NHS hospitals in England
Hospitals in Worcestershire